The Navajo Indian Irrigation Project (NIIP) is a large agricultural development located in the northwest corner of New Mexico. The NIIP is one of the largest Native American owned and operated agricultural businesses in the United States. This venture finds its origins in the 1930s when the federal government was looking for economic development for the Navajo Nation. The NIIP was approved in 1962 by Congress. The Bureau of Reclamation received the task of constructing this project.

The water supply is provided by Navajo Lake, the reservoir formed behind Navajo Dam on the San Juan River. The project service area is composed of the high benchlands south of Farmington, which experience an arid climate.

Originally designed to provide jobs for Native American family farms the project has transformed into a large corporate entity. The canal systems and most of the drainage systems were completed by the end of 1977, and farmland was gradually brought into production in "blocks" averaging . As of 2011, seven blocks totaling  of farmland were irrigated, with an eighth block under development.

References

Irrigation projects
Irrigation in the United States
Geography of the Navajo Nation
United States Bureau of Reclamation
Colorado River Storage Project